Patterns is an album by the jazz vibraphonist Bobby Hutcherson, released on the Blue Note label. Although recorded in 1968, the album was not released until 1980. "A Time to Go" was composed by James Spaulding as a tribute to Martin Luther King Jr., recorded just three weeks before his assassination. "Effi" was composed by Stanley Cowell as a dedication to his wife, and the remaining pieces were composed by Joe Chambers.

Track listing
All tracks by Joe Chambers, unless otherwise noted.

"Patterns" - 5:54
"A Time to Go" (Spaulding) - 5:44
"Ankara" - 6:24
"Effi" (Cowell) - 7:07
"Irina" - 7:20
"Nocturnal" - 4:12
"Patterns" [Alternate Take] - 6:00 Bonus track on CD reissue

Personnel
Bobby Hutcherson - vibraphone
James Spaulding - alto saxophone 4 tracks, flute 3 tracks
Stanley Cowell - piano
Reggie Workman - bass
Joe Chambers - drums

Note: The 1995 U.S. CD version of the album has the track information (as given above) on the inserts and CD label, but the CD contains the tracks in the following order:

"Effi" (Cowell) - 7:07
"Irina" - 7:20
"Nocturnal" - 4:12
"Patterns" - 5:54
"A Time to Go" (Spaulding) - 5:44
"Ankara" - 6:24
"Patterns" [Alternate Take] - 6:00 Bonus track on CD reissue

References 

1980 albums
Blue Note Records albums
Bobby Hutcherson albums
Post-bop albums
Albums produced by Francis Wolff
Albums produced by Duke Pearson
Albums recorded at Van Gelder Studio